Misharron Jermeisha Allen  (born December 7, 1996), better known as Asian Doll, Asian Da Brat, or simply Asian, is an American rapper. A Dallas native, she was the first female artist signed to Gucci Mane's 1017 Eskimo Records.

Early life 
Allen was born on December 7, 1996, to LaKeithia Lewis and Michael Allen, and was the second daughter of four children. Raised in the south side of Dallas in an area known as Park Row, Allen's early life was dealt with instability; from poverty and her father being in and out of prison. Allen had her first run-in with the law when she was 12 years old. Allen attended Skyline High School and dropped out in the 12th grade.

Career 
Her music career began with the release of Da Rise of Barbie Doll Gang Empire on December 16, 2015 and media-influenced social "beefs" have contributed to greater attention. Other projects include Drippin in Glo (2016), Project Princess Vol. 1 (2016), OuttaSpace (2017), Kill Bill, Vol. 1 (2017) Doll SZN, So Icy Princess (2018) her eighth mixtape release UNFUCCWITABLE (May 3, 2019). She released Doll SZN Reloaded on April 8, 2020. Allen is a company owner.

Public image 
In an attempt to distance herself from a group of female rappers using the stage name Doll, Allen changed her name to Asian Da Brat in 2019. The name Asian Da Brat was supposedly a reference to the veteran female rapper from Chicago, Da Brat, whose debut studio album Funkdafied was the first platinum-certified record by a female rapper. In an April 2019 interview on Hot97, Allen stated that Da Brat was a reference to the brand of girls' toys known as Bratz Dolls.

Personal life 
In January 2021, Allen opened up about suffering depression due to the death of King Von, with whom she was in an on-and-off relationship with before his passing. A few days later, she appeared on an episode of Taraji P. Henson's show Peace of Mind with Taraji to discuss his death. Allen has five tattoos dedicated to Von.

Legal issues 
In June 2018, Allen was arrested in New York City after getting into a fight. She was released a few hours later.

On September 4, 2020, Allen was arrested in Georgia, U.S., on drug charges. She was released on bond four days later.

In October, 2022, Allen was once again arrested in Douglas County, Georgia, due to failing to appear for the charges stemming from her September 2020 arrest as well as driving 20 miles per hour over the posted speed limit and not having a valid Texas driver's license.

Discography

Studio albums 
 Let's Do a Drill (2022)

Mixtapes 
 Da Rise of Barbie Doll Gang Empire (2015)
 Drippin in Glo (2016)
 Project Princess Vol. 1 (2016)
 Outtaspace (2017)
 Kill Bill, Vol. 1 (2017)
 Doll SZN (2018)
 So Icy Princess (2018)
 Unfuccwitable (2019, as Asian Da Brat)
 Fight Night (2019)
 Let's Do a Drill 2 (2023)

Extended plays 
 Doll SZN Reloaded (2020)

Singles

As lead artist 

 "Road Runner" (2017)
 "Bless" (2017)
 "Chun-Li Challenge" (2017)
 "Savage Barbie" (2018)
 "So Icy Princess Intro" (2018)
 "1017" (feat. Gucci Mane & Yung Mal) (2018)
 "First Off" (2018)
 "Truth" (2019)
 "Come Find Me" (2020)
 "Pull Up" (feat. King Von) (2020)
 "No Flockin Remix" (2016)
 "Poppin" (feat. PnB Rock) (2016)
 "Barbie Everywhere" (2016)
 "Nunnadet Shit" (2020)
 "Open Heart" (2020)
 "Back In Blood" (2021)
 "Nunnadet Shit (Remix)" (feat. DreamDoll, Rubi Rose, Dreezy & Ivorian Doll) (2021)
 "Don't Let Me Go" (2021)
 "No Exposing" (2021)
 "Viral" (2022)
 "Baby" (feat. Sheemy) (2022)
 "Fell In Love" (2022)
 "Talk Facts" (feat. Sheemy & Mula Gzz) (2022)
 "To The Moon Freestyle" (2022)
 "Get Jumped" (feat. Bandmanrill) (2022)
 "Obsessed" (feat. Sheemy) (2022)
 "Motherless Child" (2022)
 "Prettiest Problem" (feat. DAMU UP) (2022)
 "Come Outside" (2022)
 "Sky Falling" (2022)

As featured artist 
 "With You " (Jay Sean & Gucci Mane) (2019)
 "Wigs" (A$AP Ferg feat. City Girls) (2019)
 "Hi Bich (Remix)" (Bhad Bhabie feat. YBN Nahmir or MadeinTYO and Rich The Kid) (2018)
 "Gangsta" (Honey Oso feat. Cuban Doll & Asian Doll) (2018)
 "Fire Right There" (9lokkNine) (2019)
 "Tour" (Blueface feat. NLE Choppa, 9lokkNine Sada Baby and Kiddo Curry) (2020)
 "Twerk War" (Six3 feat. Asian Doll) (2020)
 "Gangsta" (Honey Oso feat. Asian Doll and Cuban Doll) (2018)
 "Double Back" (YBN Nahmir feat. Asian Doll and Cuban Doll) (2018)
 "Das Me" (Big Mali feat. Asian Doll) (2020)
 "Move Ova" (ILuvMuny feat. Asian Doll) (2018)
 "Affiliated" (Bhad Bhabie feat. Asian Doll) (2018)
 "Let Her" (PnB Meen feat. Asian Doll)
 "BLUE FACE" (Jay Guapo feat. Asian Doll)
 "WHAT IT DO" (Action Pack feat. Asian Doll) (2020)
 "Pull Up" (Asian Doll feat. King Von)
 "Doom" (Blac Chyna featuring Asian Doll) (2021)
 "We Da Opps" (Casino Jizzle feat. Asian Doll)
 "IRDGAF" (GSAMBO feat. Asian Doll) (2021)
 "Queen Of The Trap" (Million Dollar Mag feat. Asian Doll ) (2021)
 "Life of a Hitta" ($hyfromdatre feat. Asian Doll) (2021)
 "Back to Back" (NCG Kenny B feat. Asian Doll) (2021)
 "Fish Tank" (Millyz feat. Asian Doll) (2021)
 "Occasion" (Jenn Carter feat. Asian Doll) (2022)
 "Shake Dat" (Miah Kenzo feat. Asian Doll) (2022)
 "He Ain't Mine" (Kelow LaTesha feat. Asian Doll) (2022)
 "Slangin Iron" (BC Jay feat. Asian Doll) (2022)
 "Child's Play" (Dee Billz feat. Tata & Asian Doll) (2022)
 "Upside/Down (Asian Doll Remix)" (Elia Berthoud feat. Asian Doll) (2023)

References

External links 
 
 

1996 births
Living people
Rappers from Dallas
Rappers from Texas
African-American women rappers
Crips
American women rappers
21st-century American rappers
21st-century American women musicians
21st-century African-American women
Southern hip hop musicians
21st-century women rappers